High-Definition Versatile Disc (HVD) is an Asian standard of advanced high-definition technology originally developed in China by AMLogic Inc., for high-definition video. The format supports 720p, 1080i, or 1080p video on version 1 discs. Version 2 of the format added high-resolution beyond the standard fare of HD for use on non-TV monitors that support higher resolutions, up to 1080p. 

A modified MPEG-2 MP@HL video-codec is used and the format supports audio encoded in Dolby AC3, DTS, Dolby Digital EX, DTS ES, and Prologic 2 audio formats. 

All HVDs use standard DVD discs.  While the format is referred to as HVD it has no relation to the Holographic Versatile Disc format that came along later and used the same acronym.  There are only a few DVD players which support this format. Nero Showtime, Media Player Classic, PowerDVD, VLC media player, and XBMC are the few known software packages to handle the format as the MPEG2 files are non-standard. 
Though popular in China, the format, much like VCD, has had little acceptance outside Asia and  discs are rarely found for sale outside Asia.

See also
 Enhanced Versatile Disc

External links 

 

120 mm discs
Video storage
High-definition television